King Ezana's Stele is a 4th century obelisk in the ancient city of Axum, in the Tigray Region of Ethiopia. The monument stands in the middle of the Northern Stelae Park, which contains hundreds of smaller and less decorated stelae. This stele is probably the last one erected and the largest of those that remain unbroken. It is decorated with a false door at its base and apertures resembling windows on all sides.

History

The stelae are thought to be "markers" for underground burial chambers. The largest grave markers were for royal burial chambers and were decorated with multi-story false windows and false doors; nobility would have smaller, less decorated stelae. King Ezana's Stele is likely to be the last example of this practice, which was abandoned after the Axumites adopted Christianity under King Ezana. Ezana was the first monarch of Axum to embrace the faith, following the teachings and examples of his childhood tutor, Frumentius. King Ezana's Stele is also the only one of the three major "royal" obelisks (the others being the Great Stele and the Obelisk of Axum) that was never broken.

In 2007–2008, during the reassembly of the Obelisk of Axum, which had been taken to Italy in 1937 and returned to Ethiopia in 2005, King Ezana's Stela was structurally consolidated by a team of engineers led by Giorgio Croci, Professor of Structural Problems of Monuments and Historical Buildings at Sapienza University of Rome.

See also
Ezana Stone
Hawulti (monument)

References

Buildings and structures completed in the 4th century
Axumite obelisks
Buildings and structures in Axum
Archaeology of Eastern Africa